Harold Herbert Carr (25 January 1880–8 March 1973) was a New Zealand  land court judge and administrator. Of Māori descent, he identified with the Ngati Kahungunu iwi. He was born in Wairoa, Hawke's Bay, New Zealand on 25 January 1880.

References

1880 births
1973 deaths
Māori Land Court judges
Ngāti Kahungunu people
New Zealand Māori judges
People from Wairoa